Bouhdida is a town and commune in the Brakna Region of southern Mauritania.

In 2000 it had a population of 10,828.

References

Communes of Brakna Region